Energy (Stylized as E.) is a private Spanish television channel owned by Mediaset España. Its programming is aimed towards a male audience. It began test broadcasts on 27 December 2011 before fully launching on 9 January 2012.

History 
In 2010, after the merger between Gestevisión Telecinco and Sogecuatro, the newly formed group was able to add two television channels to its offer, which would be occupied by a channel aimed at women and another at men. The first channel was called Divinity and it was launched in April 2011, while in the male case the project was frozen.

In November 2011, the group's men's channel project was recovered with the announcement of the two possible names for the channel: Vertigo and Energy. Finally the second name was chosen for the channel.

The channel began broadcasting on January 9, 2012, occupying the space of Canal+ 2, in its beginnings, the channel broadcast programming based on series, documentaries, reality shows, sports and movies. 

In November 2015, the channel was reformed to focus on the transmission of television series.

Programming 

Energy airs syndicated television series, both international and local, most of them reruns of series previously aired on sister channels Telecinco and Cuatro. Previously the channel also broadcast sports broadcasts, news documentaries and movies. The first channel was called Divinity and it was launched in April 2011, while in the male case the project was frozen.

In its beginnings the channel also dedicated its transmission of events like Grand Prix motorcycle racing, the UEFA European Football Championship, Copa del Rey, the UEFA Europa League and the UEFS Futsal Men's Championship; NBA basketball and the Ultimate Fighting Championship. 

In November 2015, the channel was reformed to focus on the transmission of television series, especially American, this due to the launch of Atreseries by Atresmedia and the low audience numbers achieved in the original format, the channel also added documentaries and films to its programming, although they were later transferred to other channels of Mediaset such as Be Mad or Cuatro.

References

External links 
 

Channels of Mediaset España Comunicación
Television stations in Spain
Television channels and stations established in 2012
Spanish-language television stations
Men's interest channels